Exchange was a station on the Chicago "L" Stock Yards branch. Its ridership information is missing in 1947, but returned as Racine in 1948.

References

Works cited

1908 establishments in Illinois
1957 disestablishments in Illinois
Defunct Chicago "L" stations